Laurynas Mikalauskas (born October 2, 1985 in Palanga) is a Lithuanian professional basketball player. He plays for power forward position.

Mikalauskas played high school and college basketball in the United States, for the Blue Ridge School in Saint George, Virginia and at the University of Virginia.

References

External links
College stats @ basketball-reference.com

1985 births
Living people
BC Dzūkija players
BC Neptūnas players
BC Rakvere Tarvas players
Kavala B.C. players
Lithuanian expatriate basketball people in the United States
Lithuanian men's basketball players
Power forwards (basketball)
Sportspeople from Palanga
Virginia Cavaliers men's basketball players
RBC Pepinster players
Lithuanian expatriate basketball people in Estonia